James Walston (1949 – 12 May 2014) was a professor of international relations at The American University of Rome (AUR), specialising in Italian politics and modern history. He was chair of the AUR's Department of International Relations from 2002 to 2008.  In 2008 he started the Center for Research on Racism in Italy together with Clough Marinaro. In 1997, he became the first EU citizen to stand for election to the Rome City Council

Education
He was educated at Eton and Jesus College, Cambridge (BA 1975, and PhD 1986) and the University of Rome, La Sapienza (Diploma di Perfezionamento, 1981).

Teaching
Walston had taught mainly in the US system abroad, starting with the University of Maryland programme for the US military in Italy and the UK, Summer courses at Middlebury and various US programmes in Rome including Temple, Trinity and Loyola. Since 1991 he has taught history, politics and international relations at The American University of Rome. Since 2004 he had taught and directed the University of Rome La Sapienza's Eurosapienza's international relations module in the masters in State management and Humanitarian Affairs.

In 2003, he introduced on site teaching of international relations which includes regular field trips to European institutional sites like Brussels, Geneva and Vienna, as well as to conflict resolution sites like the Basque Country, Northern Ireland, Montenegro and Kosovo, and annual Ghana trip.

Journalism and comment
Walston published regular articles in Wanted in Rome from 1989 until his death; he also wrote a regular column for Italy Daily (Italian supplement the IHT) from 1999 to 2002, for The Guardian and The Independent.  His blog was Italian Politics with Walston.

Scholarly publications
Walston was one of the first academics who wrote about forgotten fascist Italy's role in ethnic cleansing and internments of civil population in Italian concentration camps, such as under Mario Roatta's watch in the Province of Ljubljana, that are in Italian media subjected to the repression of historical memory, and to historical revisionism especially in relation to the post-war foibe massacres.

Organised crime
1986   "See Naples and die; organised crime in Campania" in Kelly Robert (ed.) Organized crime. A global perspective Totowa NJ, Rowman & Littlefield: 134–158

Clientelism 
1988 Mafia and Clientelism. Roads to Rome in Post-war Calabria London, Routledge (revised Italian edition 1995 Le Strade per Roma. Clientelismo e politica in Calabria (1948–1992) Soveria Mannelli, Rubbettino (updated and revised translation of Mafia and clientelism)
 
Italian foreign policy
2004   "The Shift in Italy's Euro-Atlantic Policy. Partisan or Bipartisan?" The International Spectator XXXIX (2) October–December 115 – 125
2007   "Italian Foreign Policy in the 'Second Republic'. Changes of Form and Substance" Modern Italy Volume 12 (1) February
2008   "La politica estera: il difficile perseguimento di un ruolo influente" in Mark Donovan and Paolo Onofri (eds.) Politica in Italia. I fatti dell'anno e le interpretazioni Bologna, Istituto Cattaneo/Il Mulino:  151–171 "Foreign Policy: The Difficult Pursuit of Influence" in Mark Donovan and Paolo Onofri (eds.) Italian Politics. Frustrated Aspirations for Change Bologna, Istituto Cattaneo/Il Mulino: 123–140 (English version of above).

Italian history
1997   "History and memory of the Italian concentration camps", Historical Journal 40 (1) 169–183.
2000   "Nationalisms and internationalism: the response of Italian Jews to Fascism" in Thomas P. DiNapoli The Italian Jewish Experience. Forum Italicum. A journal of Italian Studies.  SUNY, Stony Brook: 141 – 154
2010 "Italy’s 'second generations': the sons and daughters of migrants" in Bulletin of Italian Politics 2 (1) Summer 2010 (with Isabella Clough Marinaro).

References

External links 
The American University of Rome
 Italian Politics with Walston

British political scientists
1949 births
2014 deaths
People educated at Eton College
International relations scholars
Alumni of Jesus College, Cambridge